Per Sorensen (born 20 June 1962) is a former international speedway rider from Denmark.

Speedway career 
Sorensen rode in the top tier of British Speedway from 1983 to 1986, riding for Swindon Robins and Oxford Cheetahs. He was a member of the Oxford team during their treble winning season of 1986.

References 

Living people
1962 births
Danish speedway riders
Oxford Cheetahs riders
Swindon Robins riders